Tom Buhrow (born 29 September 1958) is a German journalist who has been serving as intendant of the WDR since 2013.

Early life and education
Buhrow was born in Troisdorf. He studied history and political science in Bonn.

Career

Careeer in journalism
In 1978, Buhrow worked at the local newspaper Bonner General-Anzeiger.  In 1985, he was trained at the largest television station in North Rhine-Westphalia, WDR.  Since 1986 he was the editor, reporter and bureau chief of the shows Aktuelle Stunde and West 3 Aktuell. He then worked as an editor and reporter at the most-seen German nightly news, the Tagesschau.

In 1992/1993, Buhrow became the correspondent of the ARD bureau in Washington D.C. in the midst of the 1992 U.S. presidential election.

Between January 2000 and 2002, Buhrow worked as a correspondent at the ARD bureau in Paris. On 1 July 2002, he took over from Claus Kleber as chief of the ARD bureau in Washington; Kleber went to ZDF as the anchorman for the news programme heute-journal.

On 1 September 2006, Buhrow replaced Ulrich Wickert as the host of the news programme Tagesthemen.  He published a book about his years in the United States, Mein Amerika, Dein Amerika (My America, your America).

Intendant of WDR, 2013–present

On 29 May 2013 Buhrow was elected intendant of the Westdeutscher Rundfunk (WDR).

Other activities
 Bonner Akademie für Forschung und Lehre praktischer Politik (BAPP), Member of the Board of Trustees
 Civis Media Foundation, member of the board of trustees (since 2013)
 International Journalists' Programmes (IJP), member of the board of trustees
 German Coordinating-Council for Christian-Jewish Cooperation Organizations, member of the board of trustees
 Kunststiftung NRW, member of the board of trustees
 German Cancer Foundation, member of the board of trustees

Personal life
Buhrow was married to his colleague Sabine Stamer, but divorced in April 2020. They have two daughters.

References

External links

1958 births
Living people
People from Troisdorf
German television reporters and correspondents
German male journalists
German broadcast news analysts
20th-century German journalists
21st-century German journalists
ARD (broadcaster) people
Westdeutscher Rundfunk people
German television news anchors